Jaga Jazzist (also known as Jaga) is a Norwegian experimental jazz band, that rose to prominence when the BBC named their second album, A Livingroom Hush (Smalltown Supersound/Ninja Tune), the best jazz album of 2002.

Biography

The core of the band are the brothers and the main songwriters, Lars and Martin Horntveth. Martin formed Jaga Jazzist together with Ivar Christian Johansen in 1994 while they still were in their teens, though Johansen later left the group. The brothers are also prominent figures of the Norwegian pop act The National Bank.

Jaga Jazzist nearly created a sensation with their debut album Jævla Jazzist Grete Stitz (1996), that contained playful, humorous jazz with elements of rap. The EP Magazine (1998) showed signs of the catchy, cinematic approach to jazz music they later become known for. The very young Lars Horntveth became increasingly involved in composing the music they played.

After Magazine word spread about their fresh musical expressions and energetic live shows, and the band toured extensively before they signed a recording contract with Warner Music of Norway in 2000. The highly anticipated debut album for Warner, A Livingroom Hush, was released in 2001 and consists of a melodic and energetic mix of lounge jazz, cinematic themes and instrumental rock. The producer Jørgen "Sir Duper Man" Træen played an important role during the recording, and left his mark on the disc with his crackling electronics. A Livingroom Hush won the Norwegian music award Alarm Prize in 2002 and the same year was named Jazz Album of the Year by BBC listeners.

The band features trumpets, trombone, electric guitar, bass, drums, tuba, bass clarinets, Fender Rhodes, vibraphone and a rack of electronics, as well as strong melodies and rhythms. Talk Talk, Soft Machine, John Coltrane, Don Cherry, Aphex Twin, Stereolab, Squarepusher and Tortoise are frequently mentioned as sources of inspiration. Jaga Jazzist is widely considered to be one of the premier acts of the so-called nu-jazz movement of Scandinavia. Also, The Mars Volta cite Jaga Jazzist as one of their favourite bands. Jaga Jazzist's studio album, One-Armed Bandit, was released on January 25, 2010 on Ninja Tune.

In May 2013, Jaga Jazzist collaborated with the Britten Sinfonia to release Live with Britten Sinfonia on Ninja Tune, to a positive critical reception. All About Jazz's John Kelman wrote of the album:

"That Live with Britten Sinfonia was an album not necessarily intended to happen at the time of the recording only makes its release all the sweeter. This 35-piece marriage of Jaga Jazzist and Britten Sinfonia is capable of everything from earth-shattering power to refined beauty. With Britten conducted by the world-renowned Christian Eggen, Live with Britten Sinfonia is the vital document of an opportunity that no longer need feel missed by so many Jaga fans around the world—an album that, transcending their already significant accomplishments, demonstrates even greater potential for Lars Horntveth's writing and Jaga Jazzist's effortless (and faultless) performances."

Jaga Jazzist released their album Starfire in 2015 on Ninja Tune.

Current members 
Lars Horntveth – tenor sax, baritone sax, soprano sax, clarinet, bass clarinet, flute, guitar, piano, keyboards, programming, lap steel guitar (1994–present)
Line Horntveth – tuba, flute, percussion, vocals (1994–present)
Martin Horntveth – percussion, drums, programming (1994–present)
Andreas Mjøs – guitar, percussion, glockenspiel, marimba, vibraphone (1994–present)
Even Ormestad – bass, percussion, glockenspiel, keyboards (1995–present)
Erik Johannessen – trombone, marxophone, percussion (2005–present)
Øystein Moen – keyboards, percussion (2008–present)
Marcus Forsgren – guitar, effects (2009–present)

Past members 
Harald Frøland – guitar (1994–2005, 2006–2007)
Ivar Christian Johansen – trumpet, vocals (1994–2001)
Jonas Bendiksen – keyboards (1994–1997)
Lars Wabø – trombone (1994–2005)
Mads Jansen – trombone (1994)
Marius Hesby – trombone (1994)
Tomas Viken – tenor saxophone (1994)
Lars Erik Myran – bass (1994)
Jørgen Munkeby – alto saxophone, tenor saxophone, flute, alto flute, bass clarinet, keyboards (1995–2002)
Håvard Myklebust – trombone (1996)
Torgeir Audunson – trumpet (1996–1997)
Bjørn Strand – tenor saxophone (1997)
Sjur Miljeteig – trumpet (1997)
Mathias Eick – trumpet, French horn, keyboards, upright bass (1998–2014)
Morten Qvenild – keyboards (2001)
Ketil Einarsen – flute, keys, percussion (2002–2005, 2006–2007)
Andreas Hessen Schei – keyboards (2002–2005, 2006–2007)
Nils Martin Larsen – keyboards (2005)
Anders Hana – guitar, effects (2005)
Stian Westerhus – guitar, effects (2008–2009)

Discography

Studio albums 
1996: Jævla Jazzist Grete Stitz (Thug Records)
2002: A Livingroom Hush (Smalltown Supersound)
2003: The Stix (WEA International Inc.)
2005: What We Must (Ninja Tune)
2010: One-Armed Bandit (Ninja Tune)
2015: Starfire (Ninja Tune)
2020: Pyramid (Brainfeeder)

EPs 
1998: Magazine
2001: Airborne/Going Down (WEA International Inc.)
2002: Days (Smalltown Supersound)
2003: Animal Chin (Gold Standard Laboratories)
2004: Day (Ninja Tune)
2010: Bananfluer Overalt (Ninja Tune)

Live 
2013: Live with Britten Sinfonia (Ninja Tune)
2021: The Tower (Brainfeeder)

DVDs 
2009: Live at Cosmopolite (Smalltown Supersound)

Collaborations 
2003: In the Fishtank 10 (Konkurrent) – Jaga Jazzist Horns (L. Horntveth, Eick and Munkeby) in collaboration with Motorpsycho

Contributions 
2003: Sivil Ulyd 2: Sivilarbeiderplata (Passive Fist Productions), compilation various artists

References

External links 
Jaga Jazzist's Official Homepage
2010 interview with Martin Hornveth on Prog Sphere
Live report from the New York's 2011 concert on Prog Sphere
Jaga Jazzist - One-Armed Bandit (Live) on NRK by YouTube

 
Norwegian electronic music groups
Norwegian post-rock groups
Norwegian jazz ensembles
Norwegian experimental musical groups
Norwegian rock music groups
Ninja Tune artists
Musical groups established in 1994
1994 establishments in Norway
Musical groups from Oslo
Spellemannprisen winners
Acid jazz ensembles
Smalltown Supersound artists